Tetris: The Games People Play is a 2016 graphic novel by Box Brown about the history of the video game Tetris. It was selected for a panel on the "Best 2016 Graphic Novels" panel at BookExpo America 2016.

References

Bibliography

External links 

 

2016 graphic novels
English-language books
History books about video games
Tetris